Actinochaetopteryx proclinata is a species of parasitic fly in the family Tachinidae.

Distribution
Vanuatu.

References

Diptera of Australasia
Dexiinae
Insects described in 1988
Endemic fauna of Vanuatu